Rob Gerrand (born 16 October 1946) is an Australian writer of science fiction.

Works

Books 
 Transmutations (Editor, Outback Press),
 Fortress (novel, Bookman Publishing 1993)
 Rewrite Your Life! (self-help, co-written with Eve Ash, Penguin Books 2002)
 Rewrite Your Relationships! (self-help, co-written with Eve Ash, Penguin Books 2004)
 The Best Australian Science Fiction Writing: a Fifty Year Collection (editor, Black Inc. 2004)

Short Stories 
His short stories have appeared in the following publications:
 The Altered I (ed. Lee Harding, 1975),
 Envisaged Worlds (ed. Paul Collins, 1978)
 Alien Worlds (ed. Paul Collins, 1979)

Other 
He founded the Victorian Arts Centre Magazine in 1982, and was its Editor-in-Chief until 1987.
Together with Bruce Gillespie and Carey Handfield he was a partner in the Australian publishing company Norstrilia Press, 1975–1989.

References

External links
 

1946 births
Living people
Australian science fiction writers
Australian self-help writers